Gareth Knott (born 19 January 1976) is a Welsh former professional footballer. He made 5 appearances in the Football League for Gillingham and gained one cap for Wales under-21.

References

1976 births
Wales under-21 international footballers
Welsh footballers
Tottenham Hotspur F.C. players
Gillingham F.C. players
Living people
Association football midfielders
People from Blackwood, Caerphilly
Sportspeople from Caerphilly County Borough